Sir Wilfrid Joseph Sim  (3 November 1890 – 5 November 1974) was a New Zealand lawyer and soldier. 

Sim was born in Dunedin, Otago, New Zealand in 1890. William Sim was his father. Before WWI, he lived in Dunedin and when his former business partner, John Findlay, was hesitant to take him on again after the war, Sim moved to Christchurch and joined Duncan, Cotterill and Company as a partner.

Sim was appointed King's Counsel on 19 July 1939 and moved to Wellington. He was appointed an Officer of the Order of St John in 1946. In the 1951 New Year Honours, he was appointed a Knight Commander of the Order of the British Empire, for public services.

Sim was a Christchurch City Councillor from 1925 to 1927. He was a member of the National Party and served as its president for seven years from 1944 to 1951.

Notes

References

1890 births
1974 deaths
Lawyers from Dunedin
New Zealand military personnel of World War I
New Zealand recipients of the Military Cross
New Zealand King's Counsel
Officers of the Order of St John
New Zealand Knights Commander of the Order of the British Empire
Christchurch City Councillors
New Zealand National Party politicians
20th-century New Zealand lawyers